Mammadov is a popular Azerbaijani masculine surname, meaning "son of Mammad", referring to Muhammad. The feminine surname counterpoint is Mammadova. Notable people with the surname include:

Aghasi Mammadov (born 1980), Azerbaijani boxer
Alakbar Mammadov (1930–2014), Soviet and Azerbaijani footballer
Aqil Mammadov (born 1989), Azerbaijani footballer, currently for FK Baku
Arif Mammadov (ambassador) (born 1964) Azerbaijani former diplomat and opposition activist
Arif Mammadov, Azerbaijani politician, Director of State Civil Aviation Administration of Azerbaijan Republic
Azer Mammadov (born 1976), Azerbaijani footballer
Eduard Mammadov (born 1978), Azerbaijani kickboxer
Eldar Mammadov (born 1968), awarded "Hero of Azerbaijan" for his part in the Nagorno-Karabakh war
Elkhan Mammadov (disambiguation)
Elman Mammadov (born 1950), Azerbaijani politician, Member of National Assembly of Azerbaijan
Elshan Mammadov (born 1980), Azerbaijani footballer
Elvin Məmmədov (born 1988), Azerbaijani footballer
Etibar Mammadov (born 1955), Azerbaijani politician, founder and leader of Azerbaijan National Independence Party
Farid Mammadov (born 1991), Azerbaijani singer
Fazil Mammadov, Azerbaijani politician, Minister of Taxes of Azerbaijan Republic
Fikrat Mammadov Azerbaijani politician, currently Minister of Justice of Azerbaijan Republic
Garib Mammadov (born 1947), Azerbaijani scholar and politician, Chairman of State Land and Cartography Committee
Georgiy Mammadov (born 1947), Soviet and Russian diplomat
Georgiy Mammadov (born 1947), Soviet and Russian diplomat
Gurban Mammadov (born 1959), Azerbaijani politician & owner of "AzerFreedom TV"
Ilgar Mammadov (born 1970), Azerbaijani politician
Ismayil Mammadov (born 1976), Azerbaijani footballer
Israfil Mammadov (1919–1946), Soviet Azerbaijani officer
Khagani Mammadov (born 1976), Azerbaijani footballer
Magsud Mammadov (born 1929), Azerbaijani ballet dance
Mammadrafi Mammadov, Azerbaijani politician, Minister of Defense of Azerbaijan from 1993 to 1995
Nodar Mammadov, Azerbaijani footballer
Novruz Mammadov (born 1947), Azerbaijani professor of French
Novruzali Mammadov (1940–2009), Talysh national minority activist in Azerbaijan
Parvin Mammadov, Azerbaijani Paralympic powerlifter
Ramiz Mammadov (born 1968), Azerbaijani footballer
Rashad Mammadov (born 1974), Belarusian judoka
Rauf Mammadov (born 1988), Azerbaijani chess player
Samir Mammadov (born 1988), Azerbaijani boxer
Yaqub Mammadov (born 1941), Acting President of Azerbaijan in 1992
Zakir Mammadov, Correspondent member of Azerbaijan National Academy of Sciences
Ziya Mammadov, Azerbaijani politician, Minister of Transportation

See also
Ovezmammed Mammedov

Surnames
Azerbaijani-language surnames
Patronymic surnames